Neraida may refer to several places in Greece:

 Neraida, Phthiotis, in the municipality of Stylida, Phthiotis regional unit, Central Greece
 Neraida, Kozani, in the Kozani regional unit, Macedonia
 Neraida, Karditsa, in the former municipality of Itamos, Karditsa regional unit, Thessaly
 Neraida, Larissa, in the former municipality of Polydamantas, Larissa regional unit, Thessaly
 Neraida, Trikala, in the Trikala regional unit, Thessaly
 Neraida, Elis, in the former municipality of Foloi, Elis regional unit, Western Greece